Vano may refer to:
the Lovono language spoken in the Solomon Islands, sometimes described under the name Vano

In addition, Vano is both a given name and a surname. Among Georgians, it is a diminutive of the name Ivane. It may refer to:

Robert Vano (born 1948), Slovak photographer
Tom Vano (born 1970), American field hockey player
John L. Vano (born 1969), Brockton, Ma AAU 1988 Teen Mr. America
Vano Merabishvili (born 1968), Georgian politician and Prime Minister of Georgia
Vano Muradeli (1908–1970), Soviet Georgian composer
Vano Siradeghyan (born 1946), Armenian politician and writer
Vano Tarkhnishvili (born 1981), Georgian actor